Mawlana Bhashani Science and Technology University (MBSTU) is the 12th oldest public university and second science and technology specialized PhD granting public university in Bangladesh focusing in science, technology and business. It is named after the charismatic political leader Mawlana Abdul Hamid Khan Bhashani. The medium of instruction is English. Every year, in total 815 students are enrolled in undergraduate programs to study in this institution. The number of teachers is about 206. The university has continued to expand over the last few years. This includes the construction of new academic buildings, library building, teachers dorm, vice chancellor's residence, several halls for the students etc. There are seven halls (Bangabandhu Sheikh Mujibur Rahman Hall, Shahid Ziaur Rahman Hall, Jananeta Abdul Mannan Hall, Sheikh Rasel Hall for men and Shahid Janani Jahanara Imam Hall, Alema Khatun Bhashani Hall, Bangamata Sheikh Fazilatunnesa Mujib Hall for women). Md. Alauddin is vice-chancellor again for four years (2017-2021) after his first tenure (2013-2017).  In 2021, MBSTU ranked as the top research university in Bangladesh (610th in the world) by Scopus-SCImago institution ranking. In 2020, MBSTU was ranked first among all the universities of Bangladesh based on Scimago Institutions Rankings.

History
Prime Minister of The People's Republic of Bangladesh Sheikh Hasina laid the foundation-stone of MBSTU at Santosh, Tangail in 1999. During the Awami League period,Aminul Hoque was appointed as its founder project director cum vice-chancellor on 7 January 2001. Yousuf Sharif Ahmed Khan was appointed as its next vice-chancellor by the BNP lead government on 21 November 2002. Classes began on 25 October 2003 with 5 teachers and 83 students. Initially the university had two departments, Computer Science and Engineering (CSE) and Information and Communication Technology (ICT). The following year two more departments were added, Environmental Science and Resource Management (ESRM).

In the 2003–2004 academic session, three more departments were opened: Textile Engineering (TE), Biotechnology & Genetic Engineering (BGE), and Food Technology & Nutritional Science (FTNS). In the 2010–2011 academic session, four more departments were added: Business Administration, Chemistry, Mathematics and Statistics, and Physics. In 2012, Mathematics and Statistics split into two departments. The Department of Economics has started its journey under the Faculty of Social Science from the 2012–2013 academic session. In the 2013–2014 academic session, two more departments were added named Pharmacy and Biochemistry & Molecular Biology, founded by VC.

Between 2013 and 2015, MBSTU was the scene of several violent clashes allegedly involving the Bangladesh Chhatra League (BCL). University staff were beaten, payments were extorted, buildings were vandalized, classrooms were set on fire, and in May 2015 a student leader named Abu Sadaat Muhammed Khaled Musharraf was murdered, which caused Vice Chancellor Mohammad Alauddin to temporarily close the university.

List of vice-chancellors 
 Prof. Dr Md Forhad ( present )

Campus
MBSTU campus is situated at Santosh, which is in the southwestern part of Tangail. It has a modest-size campus with limited capacity for residence within walking distances of the academic buildings. This area accommodates five faculties, the administrative building, the central library, cafeteria, VC house, five student halls, teachers dorm, medical centre, sports field, monuments etc. The historic Darbar Hall (auditorium), built under the direct supervision of Mawlana Bhashani himself, a dighi (big pond) named after the mystic guru, Pir (saint/wali) Shah Zamaan, the Mazaar (Shrine) of Mawlana Bhashani, a mosque and several other institutions are also present within the university premises. Bijoy angon and Memorial for the memory of martyr intellectual 1971 is also the favourite place for students.

Besides these, the university also owns some land in Hrathkhola, Santosh, where the residential facility for the teachers' has been proposed to be constructed. 

Recently, with the intervention of Hon'ble Prime Minister, Sirajganj Government Veterinary College - is going to be an Out Reach Campus of MBSTU . The off-campus will be handed over to the university very soon

Academics
The academic departments of the university offer degree programs in different engineering and science disciplines under five faculties - the faculty of Engineering, Faculty of Life Science, Faculty of Science, Faculty of Business Administration and Faculty of Social Science. Dept. of Biotechnology and Genetic Engineering is historically prominent in the country which has astounding lab facilities in collaboration with the University of Saskatchewan. All the departments offer undergraduate degree programs and currently 15 departments offer the graduate program. These are the following all departments.

Ranking and reputation

Undergraduate degree programs
The University has 16 Departments under 5 Faculties.

Graduate Degree Programs

Faculty of Engineering
 Department of Computer Science and Engineering (CSE)
 Department of Information and Communication Technology (ICT)
 Department of Textile Engineering (TE)

Faculty of Life Science
 Department of Biotechnology and Genetic Engineering (BGE)
 Department of Environmental Science and Resource Management (ESRM)
 Department of Food Technology and Nutrition Science (FTNS)
Department of Biochemistry and Molecular Biology ( BMB)
Department of Criminology and Police Science (CPS)

Faculty of Science
 Department of Chemistry (CHEM)
 Department of Mathematics (MAT)
 Department of Physics (PHY)
 Department of Statistics (STAT)

Faculty of Business Studies
 Department of Accounting (ACC)
 Department of Management Studies (MGT)

Faculty of Social Science
 Department of Economics (ECO)
Department of English (ENG)

Academic calendar
The academic year and session are generally divided into two semesters. One semester is composed of 18.4 weeks. Classes run from 8:00am to 5:00pm five days a week (Saturday through Wednesday). Thursday and Friday are the weekend. The session usually starts after completion of the second semester. A full-time undergraduate course consists of four sessions or eight semesters. A regular examination is held at the end of each semester as semester final examination besides class tests, assignments, project works for continuous assessment of progress.

Admission
BSc admission in MBSTU is now very competitive, determined in part through a highly competitive admission test. After completion of the higher secondary level (HSC) education, a student can submit an application for undergraduate admission test if he or she fulfils the minimum requirement. Students with a minimum grade in the subjects related to the respective departments in their higher secondary examination are allowed to appear in the admission test. There are four units in the admission test program - A unit for Engineering faculty, B unit for Life Science faculty, C unit for Science faculty and D unit comprises Business Studies and Social Science faculty. For the admission of the undergraduate programs in session 2016–17 at MBSTU, 66730 candidates competed against 795 seats; approximately 85 students competed for each seat. The most competitive unit is A unit as the most significant number of students opt for the engineering departments. In the 2016-17 session, approximately 23 thousand students competed for 165 seats in A unit making it the most competitive one as almost 140 students competed for each seat.

For admission to M.S. and PGD programs, candidates are required to appear in admission tests. Dept. of Biotechnology and Genetic Engineering offers PhD program with several grants and projects from government and International funded aid.

Campus life

Various cultural activities such as Ekushey February (International Mother Language Day), Shwadhinota Dibosh (Independence Day), Bijoy Dibosh (Victory Day), Mawlana Bhashani's birth and death anniversaries, Pohela Boishakh (the first day of the Bengali calendar), Boshonto Boron (the first day of spring in the Bengali calendar) etc., are celebrated annually. Apart from these national events many other festivals such as programming contests, seminars, workshops, symposiums, debating competitions, quiz contests, Film Festival, Book Fair, cultural functions, etc. are organized throughout the year.

Library

The central library is situated in a significant point of the campus with a calm & relaxing environment, essential for the readers to engage themselves in concentrating on their studies. A vast collection of course oriented books along with a variety of reference books as well as books that are beyond the courses offered by the university. The collection of books of the library is sufficient enough for any student of any department to acquire knowledge on his particular subjects. The central library is equipped with several Xerox machines to facilitate the students to photocopy any book or journal that he needs to study at home.

The central library is proposed to emerge into an electronic library soon so that it can run more flexibly & the students can get the chance to take the advantage of the library to the fullest.

The university library has been marching forward keeping pace with the motto "Digital Bangladesh". There is a digital library corner functioning in the library premises. Along with the advancement the university is also committed to enlighten the students with the knowledge of history and culture and so there is a "Liberation War Corner" in the library building enriched with books about the bloody liberation war of 1971 of our beloved. Students can study those scriptures to gain knowledge about our nations heritage, culture and sacrifice.

Besides the Central Library, every department has its own seminar library to fulfil the demands of the students and teachers. Every department's Seminar Library has a vast collection of books on topics within and beyond the academic courses of that department.

Halls of residence
There are seven halls to provide residential accommodation and non-residential attachments for MBSTU students. A provost/superintendent and an assistant provost are appointed for every hall administration. The halls are listed below:

Male halls
 Jananeta Abdul Mannan Hall (also known as JAMH )
 Bangabandhu Sheikh Mujibur Rahman Hall (also known as BSMRH )
 Shahid Ziaur Rahman Hall (also known as SZRH )
 Sheikh Rasel Hall (also known as SRH)

Female halls
 Alema Khatun Bhashani Hall (also known as AKBH )
 Shaheed Janani Jahanara Imam Hall (former residence of the Zamindar of Santosh during the British Raj, now MBSTU property)
 Bangamata Sheikh Fazilatunnesa Mujib Hall

Currently, there are some academic halls that are under construction and soon to be fully functional to meet the demands of the students' residential affairs.

Health services

The medical centre of MBSTU offers free medical services and medicines to students, teachers and staff of the university, and to the family member of the teachers and staff. It has its own ambulance service ready round the clock for any serious need.

Student organizations and societies
 Nutrition Club of MBSTU
 Bangladesh Society of Criminology (BSC)
 Biotechnology Club of MBSTU
 Computer Club of MBSTU
 MBSTU Open Source Network
 Prothom Alo Bondhushava, MBSTU
 Raising Awareness for Conserving Environment - RACE
 Society of Criminology and Police Science (SCPS)
 Society of ICT, MBSTU
 Textile Club, MBSTU
 Physics Society of MBSTU
 IEEE MBSTU Student Branch (IEEE MBSTU SB)
 IEEE MBSTU Computer Society (IEEE MBSTU CS)

Alumni association
To organize its former students, MBSTU has its own Alumni Association like all other universities. Mawlana Bhashani Science and Technology University Alumni Association (MBSTUAA) started its official journey in 2010. The ad-hoc committee is running. North American MBSTU Association (NAMA) is an association of ex-students from MBSTU in North America (United States, Canada).

See also
 Military Institute of Science and Technology (MIST)
 Hajee Mohammad Danesh Science and Technology University (HSTU)

References

External links

 University's Official Website
 Mawlana Bhashani Science and Technology University Act, 2001
   https://journal.mbstu.ac.bd/

Public universities of Bangladesh
Universities of science and technology in Bangladesh
Tangail City
1999 establishments in Bangladesh